Christian Harris (born January 16, 2001) is an American football linebacker for the Houston Texans of the National Football League (NFL). He played college football at Alabama and was drafted by the Texans in the third round of the 2022 NFL Draft.

Early years
Harris attended Louisiana State University Laboratory School in Baton Rouge, Louisiana. He played wide receiver and corner back in high school. He played in the 2019 All-American Bowl. Harris originally committed to play college football at Texas A&M University before flipping his commitment to the University of Alabama.

College career
Harris entered his true freshman year at Alabama in 2019 as a linebacker despite not playing the position in high school. He opened the season as a starter and ended up starting 12 of 13 games, recording 63 tackles and being named freshman All-SEC. Harris returned as a starter his sophomore year in 2020. On January 17, 2022, Harris declared his intentions to enter the 2022 NFL Draft.

Professional career

Harris was selected in the third round (75th overall) by the Houston Texans in the 2022 NFL Draft. He was placed on injured reserve on September 1, 2022. He was activated on October 22.

References

External links
 Houston Texans bio
Alabama Crimson Tide bio

2001 births
Living people
Players of American football from Baton Rouge, Louisiana
American football linebackers
Alabama Crimson Tide football players
Houston Texans players